The 2017 Rally Sweden (formally known as the Rally Sweden 2017) was a motor racing event for rally cars that was held over three days between 10 and 12 February 2017. It marked the sixty-fifth running of the Rally Sweden, and was the second round of the 2017 World Rally Championship and the WRC-2 and WRC-3 championships.

Toyota's driver Jari-Matti Latvala won the rally ahead of M-Sport drivers Ott Tänak and Sébastien Ogier who finished second and third, respectively. The win for Toyota was their first after their return to the WRC after a 17 year absence.

Latvala had inherited the lead after rally leader Thierry Neuville had crashed out on the final stage of leg 2. The Belgian had a lead of 43.3 seconds before ripping a wheel off in the second run of the Karlstad stage, promoting Latvala to first place.

Local driver Pontus Tidemand won the WRC-2 category, finishing ahead of Teemu Suninen.

Entry list

Classification

Event standings

Special stages

Power Stage 
The Power Stage was a  stage at the end of the rally.

Championship standings after the rally

Drivers' Championship standings

Manufacturers' Championship standings

References

External links

 The official website of the World Rally Championship
 Results at eWRC.com

2017
2017 World Rally Championship season
2017 in Swedish motorsport
February 2017 sports events in Europe